Angaraag "Papon" Mahanta is an Indian playback singer . He lent his voice in numerous songs of different languages including Hindi, Assamese, Bengali, Tamil and Marathi. This article lists songs recorded by Angaraag Mahanta.

Hindi film songs

Assamese film and drama songs

Bengali film songs

Other regional film songs

Non-film recordings

Television performances

References

Mahanta, Angaraag